Calling All Husbands is a 1940 American comedy film directed by Noel M. Smith and written by Robert E. Kent and based on Martin Flavin's 1929 play "Broken Dishes".  The film stars George Tobias, Lucile Fairbanks, Ernest Truex, George Reeves, Florence Bates and Charles Halton. The film was released by Warner Bros. on September 7, 1940.

Plot

Cast 
George Tobias as Oscar Armstrong
Lucile Fairbanks as Bette Trippe
Ernest Truex as Homer Trippe
George Reeves as Dan Williams
Florence Bates as Emmie Trippe
Charles Halton as Hadley Weaver
Virginia Sale as Mabel Parker
John Alexander as Sheriff Ben Bar
Clem Bevans as Judge Todd
Sam McDaniel as Nappy 
Elliott Sullivan as Chunky

References

External links 
 

1940 films
Warner Bros. films
American comedy films
1940 comedy films
Films directed by Noel M. Smith
American black-and-white films
1940s English-language films
1940s American films